Franz Xaver Johann Nepomuk Graf Saint-Julien und Walsee (French: François-Xavier de Guyard, comte de Saint-Julien) (baptised 12 October 1756; died 16 January 1836 in Skalička) was an Austrian infantry commander during the French Revolutionary Wars and the War of the Fifth Coalition.

Footnotes

Austrian Empire military leaders of the French Revolutionary Wars
Austrian Empire commanders of the Napoleonic Wars
1756 births
1836 deaths